This is the complete list of Asian Games medalists in artistic swimming from 1994 to 2018.

Women

Solo

Duet

Team

Combination

References
Medallists from previous Asian Games – Solo
Medallists from previous Asian Games – Duet
Medallists from previous Asian Games – Team
2010 Asian Games Results

External links
2002 Asian Games Official Report, Pages 247–248
2006 Asian Games Official Website

Artistic swimming
medalists